The Early Widows is the fourth album by Canadian singer-songwriter Justin Rutledge, released on May 4, 2010 on Six Shooter Records. The album, produced by Canadian singer-songwriter Hawksley Workman, was recorded at The Woodshed, a recording studio owned by Canadian country-rock band Blue Rodeo. According to Rutledge, the songs are written with a single character in mind from the Michael Ondaatje novel Divisadero.

The album was a longlisted nominee for the 2010 Polaris Music Prize.

Track listing

Ondaatje contributed to the writing of several of the songs, and is credited as co-writer on the single "Be a Man".

The track "I Have Not Seen the Light" is co-written with Nashville singer-songwriter Darrell Scott.

Personnel
 David Baxter – electric guitar
 Burke Carroll – pedal steel
 Gary Craig – Stew Crookes – tubular bells, electric guitar
 Bazil Donovan – bass
 Julie Fader – voice
 Blake Manning – drums, percussion
 Oh Susanna – voice
 Justin Rutledge – electric, acoustic and 12-string guitars, piano, wurlitzer, voice
 Hawksley Workman – electric guitar, piano, percussion
 Jesse Zubot – violin, viola, mandolin, soundscapes
 Amoy Levy, Nevon Sinclair, Sharon Riley – choir

References

2010 albums
Justin Rutledge albums
Six Shooter Records albums